The Italo-Ethiopian Treaty of 1928, also known as the Italo–Ethiopian Treaty of Friendship and Arbitration, was a treaty signed between the Kingdom of Italy (Regno d'Italia) and the Ethiopian Empire (Abyssinia) on 2 August 1928.
Nigiste Negest Zewditu I ruled Ethiopia at the time of this treaty.  But it was 36-year-old Ras Tafari Makonnen who represented the government of Ethiopia.  Tafari, while still in his minority, was heir apparent and Regent Plenipotentiary.

Within two months, on 7 October 1928, Ras Tafari would be proclaimed Negus.  A little over two years later, on 2 November 1930, Zewditu had died and Tafari was proclaimed Nəgusä Nägäst Haile Selassie I.

Background
In 1926, Italy and Britain attempted a joint commercial penetration of Ethiopia.  By bringing pressure jointly upon Ras Tafari, the Italians planned to exploit a railway and the British hoped to construct a mighty water works for irrigating the Anglo-Egyptian Sudan.  While Tafari yielded momentarily, he subsequently made a protest to the League of Nations so potent that British public opinion turned against the water works scheme and it was cancelled.  This left the Italians in the lurch.

Rather than give up his own plans, Italian dictator Benito Mussolini enlisted the aid of King Victor Emmanuel's cousin, the Duke of Abruzzi. In 1928, with pomp and panoply, the Duke and a suite of Royal proportions crossed the Mediterranean, sailed down the eastern coast of Africa, and then struck inland to Ethiopia and its remote capital, Addis Ababa. The Duke thawed the suspicious Tafari's reservations by giving him a large Isotta Fraschini limousine, a luxurious Italian product which at that time sold in the United States for some $18,000 along with many other gifts.

Details
The treaty declared a 20-year friendship between the two nations, access to the sea for Ethiopia, a road for Italy, and an agreement to settle future disagreements through the League of Nations. Also, the treaty did this:
Provide a concession to Ethiopia at the Red Sea port of Asseb in the Italian colony of Eritrea.
Call for the two nations to co-operate in building a road between Asseb and Dessie.
Make the border between Italian Somaliland and Ethiopia 21 leagues parallel to the Benadir coast (approximately 57.5 mi).

Aftermath
Both sides were at cross-purposes when they approached the Italo-Ethiopian Treaty of 1928. Mussolini wanted the treaty to be a vehicle that allowed Italy to penetrate Ethiopia economically. He never intended to approach the League of Nations for arbitration. Meanwhile, Ras Tafari wanted arbitration but never intended to allow the Italian road from the sea to be built. He considered the road from Asseb to be a natural invasion route.

See also
 Italian Colonial Empire
 Abyssinia Crisis
 Second Italo-Ethiopian War
 League of Nations
 Prince Luigi Amedeo, Duke of the Abruzzi

Notes 
Footnotes

Citations

References

External links

1928 in Ethiopia
Peace treaties of Ethiopia
Treaties of the Ethiopian Empire
Interwar-period treaties
Treaties concluded in 1928
Treaties of the Kingdom of Italy (1861–1946)
Ethiopia–Italy relations
Peace treaties of Italy